The Iara is a river in the Apuseni Mountains, Cluj County, western Romania. It is a left tributary of the river Arieș. It flows through the villages Valea Ierii, Băișoara and Iara, and joins the Arieș in Buru.

Tributaries
The following rivers are tributaries to the river Iara (from source to mouth):

Left: Șoimul, Valea Calului and Agriș
Right: Măruț, Valea Sălașelor, Săvulești, Ierța and Almășeni

References

Rivers of Romania
Rivers of Cluj County